The Mira-Nila House is a historic mansion building in Quezon City, Metro Manila, Philippines. Situated along Mariposa Street in Cubao, the building owned by the Benitez family is a declared Heritage House by the National Historical Commission of the Philippines, and one of the only two such declared houses in Metro Manila along with the Lichauco Heritage House in Santa Ana, Manila. The building currently houses a museum.

Architecture and design

The Mira-Nila is an Art Deco building inspired from the design of houses of similar architectural style in Florence, Italy. The house is four storeys high, has a basement, and a tower which served as an observation point. The design of the building was reportedly largely unaltered.

A catalogue of Florentine houses from a Magazine brought home by three sisters of Francisca and Conrado Benítez from a Europe trip served as reference for the design. The Benitez couple themselves were responsible for the architectural design of the building and opted not to commission an architect.

References

Buildings and structures in Quezon City
Museums established in 2019
Heritage Houses in the Philippines
Houses in Metro Manila
Art Deco architecture in the Philippines
2019 establishments in the Philippines
Houses completed in 1920